The infraspinatous fascia is a dense fibrous membrane, covering the Infraspinatous muscle and fixed to the circumference of the infraspinatous fossa; it affords attachment, by its deep surface, to some fibers of that muscle. It is intimately attached to the deltoid fascia along the over-lapping border of the Deltoideus.

References

Fascia